Dun & Bradstreet, Inc. v. Greenmoss Builders, Inc., 472 U.S. 749 (1985), was a Supreme Court case which held that a credit reporting agency could be liable in defamation if it carelessly relayed (i.e. published) false information that a business had declared bankruptcy when in fact it had not.

Facts
Dun & Bradstreet, a credit rating agency, sent a report to five subscribers indicating that Greenmoss Builders, a construction contractor, had filed a voluntary petition for bankruptcy.  The report was false and grossly misrepresented the contractor's financial health.  Thereafter, Dun & Bradstreet issued a corrective notice, but the contractor had already been harmed.

Procedural history
The contractor brought a defamation action in Vermont state court, alleging that the false report had injured its reputation and seeking damages.  After trial, the judge submitted the case to the jury without specific instructions as to the level of fault (negligence, actual malice, or strict liability) the jury was required to find before awarding damages against Dun & Bradstreet for defamation.  The jury returned a verdict against Dun & Bradstreet in the contractor's favor and awarded both compensatory and punitive damages.  Dun & Bradstreet, however, moved for a new trial, and the trial court granted the motion.  The Vermont Supreme Court reversed the grant of the motion, holding that the First Amendment allowed an award of damages against a nonmedia defendant such as Dun & Bradstreet, even without a showing of special fault.

Result
The United States Supreme Court affirmed the Vermont Supreme Court's judgment.  The court balanced the state's interest in protecting and compensating private individuals for injury to their reputation against the First Amendment right to free speech.  The court found that First Amendment interests were less controlling in matters of a purely private concern than matters which are a public interest.  The Supreme Court did not overturn Vermont state law allowing awards of presumed and punitive damages absent a showing of "actual malice".

See also
 List of United States Supreme Court cases, volume 472

External links

United States Supreme Court cases
United States Supreme Court cases of the Burger Court
United States defamation case law
United States Free Speech Clause case law
1985 in United States case law
Dun & Bradstreet